Adam Taylor is an American composer. He is best known for his contributions to film and television scores, such as The Handmaid's Tale (2017-present),  Before I Fall, I Think We're Alone Now and Chilling Adventures of Sabrina (2018–present).

Taylor has twice been nominated for the Primetime Emmy Award for Outstanding Music Composition for a Series for his scoring of The Handmaid’s Tale, in 2019 and 2021.

Biography
A self-taught musician from Long Beach, California, Taylor learned guitar at age 15 and performed in bands during education. He later created background music for prayer meetings at his church, which was heard by a film writer and director, Eliot Rausch. They collaborated on some short films together, and Taylor contributed to the soundtrack of August: Osage County (composed by Gustavo Santaolalla), before his first full soundtrack credit, Meadowland (2015). More recently, he composed for the TV series The Handmaid's Tale and Chilling Adventures of Sabrina.

Filmography
As composer
Meadowland (2015)
Before I Fall (2017)
Curvature (2017)
The Handmaid's Tale (2017–present)
Damnation (2017-2018)
I Think We're Alone Now (2018)
Chilling Adventures of Sabrina (2018–2020)

References

21st-century American composers
Living people
Year of birth missing (living people)